Phi Beta Gamma was a professional fraternity in the field of Law.

History
Phi Beta Gamma was founded on April 24, 1922 at Georgetown University School of Law. It was a founding member of the Professional Interfraternity Conference in 1928 and continued on to be a founding member of the Professional Fraternity Association from the merger of the PIC and PPA in 1978.

Publications
The quarterly publication is The Advocate

Chapters
The chapters of Phi Beta Gamma were as follows; a review of campus websites shows all are dormant. Active chapters in bold, inactive chapters in italics, unknown activity in plan text:
 Alpha, 1922, Georgetown University Law School
 Beta, 1924, National University School of Law
 Gamma, 1925, University of Minnesota Law School
 Delta, 1925, St. Paul College of Law
 Epsilon, 1925, George Washington University Law School
 Zeta, 1926, Loyola University New Orleans College of Law
 Eta, 1927, Cumberland School of Law
 Theta, 1929, Jefferson School of Law (Kentucky)
 Iota, 1932, University of Baltimore School of Law
 Kappa, 1932, University of Miami School of Law (Florida)
 Lambda, 1939, University of Tulsa College of Law

See also 
 Order of the Coif (honor society, law)
 The Order of Barristers (honor society, law; litigation)
 Phi Delta Phi (honor society, law; was a professional fraternity)
 Alpha Phi Sigma (honor society, criminal justice)
 Lambda Epsilon Chi (honor society, paralegal)

 Delta Theta Phi (professional fraternity, law)
 Gamma Eta Gamma (professional fraternity, law)
 Phi Alpha Delta (professional fraternity, law)
 Phi Delta Delta (professional fraternity, women, law)
 Sigma Delta Kappa (professional fraternity, law)
 Kappa Alpha Pi (professional) (professional fraternity, pre-law)

 Kappa Beta Pi (originally women's professional fraternity, now legal association, law)
 Nu Beta Epsilon (Jewish, originally men's professional fraternity, law, dormant?)

References

Former members of Professional Fraternity Association